Taher Ali al-Aqili (born 1970) is a Yemeni military officer. He served as chief of Staff of the Yemeni Army of the internationally recognized government forces. On 4 September 2017, he was appointed to this position and promoted to the rank of major general. On 5 January 2018, he survived a landmine explosion and suffered injuries when he was visiting the northern Al Jawf Governorate during fighting between government forces and Houthi fighters.

References 

Yemeni generals
Yemeni military officers
Living people
Ministry of Defense (Yemen)
1970 births
People from Amran Governorate
Chiefs of the General Staff (Yemen)